Burlington is a town in Hartford County, Connecticut, United States.

Incorporated in 1806, the population was 9,519 at the 2020 census. Burlington is home to the State of Connecticut Fish Hatchery, the Nepaug Reservoir, and Sessions Woods Wildlife Management Area. Almost half of the land in the town is owned by three public water supply companies and the State of Connecticut.

History
The area that includes present-day Bristol was originally inhabited by the Tunxis Native American tribe, who spoke an Algonquian language.

The town was once part of larger Farmington Plantation. In 1785, it split away and became a part of the town of Bristol. In 1806, Burlington separated from Bristol and became a town in its own right.

Geography

Demographics

As of the census of 2010, there were 9,326 people, 3,303 households, and 2,691 families residing in the town. The racial makeup of the town was 96.5% White, 0.6% African American, 0.0% Native American, 1.5% Asian, 0.0% Pacific Islander, 0.5% from other races, and 0.9% from two or more races. Hispanic or Latino people of any race were 2.6% of the population.

There were 3,303 households, out of which 40.7% had children under the age of 18 living with them, 71.4% were married couples living together, 6.5% had a female householder with no husband present, and 14.5% were non-families. 18.5% of all households were made up of individuals, and 5.5% had someone living alone who was 65 years of age or older.  The average household size was 2.82 and the average family size was 3.13.

In the town, the population was spread out, with 29.0% under the age of 19, 6.4% from 20 to 29, 10.2% from 30 to 39, 20.6% from 40 to 49, 23.7% from 50 to 64, and 5.4% who were 65 years of age or older.  The median age was 42.5 years.

Economic figures  for the town include a median income for a household at $105,250, and the median income for a family at $114,544. About 2.3% of families have incomes under $15,000/year and 11.9% of families have incomes over $200,000/year.

Government and politics

Schools
Regional School District #10 serves the Connecticut towns of Burlington and Harwinton and was established in 1962.  The four schools of the district, Lewis S. Mills High School, Har-Bur Middle School, Lake Garda School and Harwinton Consolidated School, have a total enrollment of more than 2800 students.

Notable locations
Seventh Day Baptist Cemetery dates back to the late 18th century. It was used as a burial ground for members of the Seventh Day Baptist Church. The cemetery has mistakenly been referred to as "Burlington Center Cemetery" but it is known by locals as Green Lady Cemetery, due to a ghost that purportedly haunts the grounds.
Whigville (once known as Poverty Hollow) is a village in the southern section of Burlington known for flat, expansive fields and the Grange Hall.

Notable people

 Samuel Griswold (1790–1867), industrialist born in Burlington
 Leonidas Lent Hamline (1797–1865), Methodist Episcopal bishop and founder of Hamline University; born in Burlington

References

External links

Town of Burlington official website

 
Towns in Hartford County, Connecticut
Towns in Connecticut
Greater Hartford